Nationality words link to articles with information on the nation's poetry or literature (for instance, Irish or France).

Events
 The first annual The Best American Poetry volume is published this year.
 During a poetry reading in which popular Russian poet Andrei Voznesensky takes written questions from the audience, he reads out two responses: "All of you are Jews or sold out to Jews", one reads. Another only says, "We will kill you". In The Ditch: A Spiritual Trial, published in 1986, Voznesensky had written poetry and prose about a 1941 German massacre of 12,000 Russians in the Crimea, and the looting of their mass graves in the 1980s by Soviet citizens that was tolerated, he said, by officials because the victims were primarily Jews. Voznesensky reads the notes out loud and challenges the writers to identify themselves. None does.

Works published in English
Listed by nation where the work was first published and again by the poet's native land, if different; substantially revised works listed separately:

Australia
 Robert Gray, Piano
 Jennifer Maiden, The Trust, Black Lightning, Australia
 Chris Mansell, Redshift/Blueshift, Five Islands Press
 Chris Wallace-Crabbe, I'm Deadly Serious, Oxford: Oxford University Press

Canada
 Louis Dudek, Infinite Worlds: The Poetry of Louis Dudek. Robin Blaser ed. Montreal: Véhicule Press.
 Elisabeth Harvor, If Only We Could Drive Like This Forever
 Dorothy Livesay, Beginnings. Winnipeg: Peguis.
 Roy Miki, Tracing the Paths, about bp nichol, critical study;
 Raymond Souster, Asking for More. Ottawa: Oberon Press.

India, in English
 Jayanta Mahapatra, Burden and Fruit ( Poetry in English ), Washington, D.C.: Three Continents Press
 Eunice de Souza, Women in Dutch Painting, Bombay: XAL-PRAXIS
 Meena Alexander, House of a Thousand Doors ( Poetry and prose in English ),   Washington, D.C.: Three Continents Press, by an Indian writing living in and published in the United States
 Sujata Bhatt, Brunizem ( Poetry in English ),Carcanet Press and New Delhi: Penguin; won the Commonwealth Poetry Prize (Asia) and the Alice Hunt Bartlett Award
 Robin Ngangom, Words and the Silence ( Poetry in English ), Calcutta: Writers Workshop

Ireland
 Ciaran Carson, The New Estate and Other Poems, Oldcastle: New Gallery Press, 
 Harry Clifton, The Liberal Cage, Oldcastle: New Gallery Press, 
 Paul Durcan, Jesus and Angela, Irish poet published in the United Kingdom
 Seamus Heaney: The Sounds of Rain, Emory University, Northern Irish poet at this time living in the United States
 Valentin Iremonger, Sandymount, Dublin, including "This Houre Her Vigill", "Clear View in Summer" and "Icarus"
 Thomas Kinsella:
 Blood and Family, including "The Messenger" and "Out of Ireland"
 One Fond Embrace: Peppercanister 13
 Philippe Jaccottet, The Selected Poems of Philippe Jaccottet, Viking, translated from French by Derek Mahon, Irish poet published in the United Kingdom
 Medbh McGuckian, On Ballycastle Beach Northern Irish poet published in the United Kingdom

New Zealand
 Fleur Adcock, Meeting the Comet, Newcastle upon Tyne: Bloodaxe Books (New Zealand poet who moved to England in 1963)
 Jenny Bornholdt, This Big Face
 Allen Curnow, Continuum: New and Later Poems 1972–1988
 Lauris Edmond, Summer Near the Arctic Circle
 Michele Leggott, Like This?: Poems, Christchurch: Caxton Press, New Zealand
 Cilla McQueen, Benzina winner of the 1989 New Zealand Book Award for Poetry
 Ian Wedde, Tendering
 Lydia Wevers, editor, Yellow Pencils: Contemporary Poetry by New Zealand Women, anthology

United Kingdom
 Fleur Adcock, Meeting the Comet, Newcastle upon Tyne: Bloodaxe Books (New Zealand poet who moved to England in 1963)
 Patricia Beer, Collected Poems
 Alison Brackenbury, Christmas Roses
 Ciarán Carson: The New Estate and Other Poems, Gallery Press, Irish poet published in the United Kingdom
 Charles Causley, A Field of Vision
 Jack Clemo, Selected Poems
 Wendy Cope:
 Does She Like Word-Games?
 Men and their Boring Arguments
 Helen Dunmore, The Raw Garden
 Douglas Dunn, Northlight
 Paul Durcan, Jesus and Angela, Irish poet published in the United Kingdom
 Elaine Feinstein, Mother's Girl: Hutchinson
 David Gascoyne, Collected Poems
 Lee Harwood, Crossing the frozen river: selected poems
 Ian Hamilton, Fifty Poems
 Seamus Heaney: The Sounds of Rain, Emory University, Northern Ireland native at this time living in the United States
 John Heath-Stubbs:
 Collected Poems 1942-1987, Carcanet Press
 A Partridge in a Pear Tree: Poems for the Twelve Days of Christmas
 Time Pieces, Hearing Eye. 
 Selima Hill, My Darling Camel
 Libby Houston, Necessity
 Ted Hughes, Moon-Whales, first British edition; published originally in the United States, 1976
 Mick Imlah, Birthmarks (Chatto Windus, 1988), 
 Philippe Jaccottet, The Selected Poems of Philippe Jaccottet, translated from French by Derek Mahon, Viking
 Philip Larkin, Collected Poems
 Alan Jenkins, In the Hot-House
 Philip Larkin, Collected Poems, edited by Anthony Thwaite; posthumously published
 George MacBeth, Anatomy of a Divorce
 Norman MacCaig, Voice-Over
 Medbh McGuckian, On Ballycastle Beach Northern Ireland poet published in the United Kingdom
 Edwin Morgan, Themes on a Variation
 Grace Nichols, editor, Black Poetry, illustrated by Michael Lewis, Blackie (London, England), published as Poetry Jump-Up, Penguin (Harmondsworth, England), in 1989
 Brian Patten, Storm Damage
 Kathleen Raine, To the Sun
 Peter Reading, Final Demands
 Jeremy Reed, Engaging Form
 Carol Rumens, The Greening of the Snow Beach
 E. J. Scovell, Collected Poems
 Peter Scupham, The Air Show
 Jo Shapcott, Electroplating the Baby
 Lemn Sissay, Tender Fingers in a Clenched Fist
 R.S. Thomas, The Echoes Return Slow
 Nika Turbina, First Draft: Poems by Nika Turbina, translated by Elaine Feinstein and Antonina W. Bouis, Marion Boyars
 Heathcote Williams, Whale Nation

Anthologies
The New British Poetry, a poetry anthology, jointly edited by Gillian Allnutt, Fred D'Aguiar, Ken Edwards and Eric Mottram, respectively concerned with feminist, Afro-Caribbean, younger and British poetry revival poets, all writing from 1968 to 1988
 Elaine Feinstein, editor, PEN New Poetry II, Quartet

United States
 Meena Alexander, House of a Thousand Doors, poetry and prose, Washington, D.C.: Three Continents Press, by an Indian writing living in and published in the United States
 Ted Berrigan, A Certain Slant of Sunlight
 Joseph Brodsky: To Urania : Selected Poems, 1965-1985, New York: Farrar, Straus & Giroux Russian-American
 Gwendolyn Brooks, Winnie
 Raymond Carver, In a Marine Light: Selected Poems
 Maxine Chernoff, Japan (Avenue B Press)
 Billy Collins, The Apple That Astonished Paris
 Seamus Heaney: The Sounds of Rain, Emory University, Northern Ireland native at this time living in the United States
 Jane Hirshfield, Of Gravity & Angels
 John Hollander:
 Melodious Guile: Fictive Pattern in Poetic Language
 Harp Lake
 Ono no Komachi and Izumi Shikibu, The Ink Dark Moon: Love Poems by Ono no Komachi and Izumi Shikibu, Women of the Ancient Court of Japan (posthumous), translated by Jane Hirshfield and Mariko Aratani
 Federico García Lorca, Poeta en Nueva York first translation into English as "Poet in New York" this year (written in 1930, first published posthumously in 1940)
 William Logan, Sullen Weedy Lakes
 James Merrill, The Inner Room
 W. S. Merwin:
 The Rain in the Trees, New York: Knopf
 Selected Poems, New York: Atheneum
 Michael Palmer, Sun
 Marie Ponsot, The Green Dark
 Rosmarie Waldrop, Shorter American Memory (Paradigm Press)

Poets appearing in The Best American Poetry 1988
The 75 poets included in The Best American Poetry 1988, edited by David Lehman, co-edited this year by John Ashbery:

A. R. Ammons
Ralph Angel
Rae Armantrout
John Ash
John Ashbery
Ted Berrigan
Mei-mei Berssenbrugge
George Bradley
Stefan Brecht
Joseph Brodsky
Nicholas Christopher
Marc Cohen
Wanda Coleman
Clark Coolidge
Alfred Corn

Douglas Crase
Robert Creeley
Thomas M. Disch
Kenward Elmslie
Alice Fulton
Amy Gerstler
Jorie Graham
Debora Greger
Allen Grossman
Barbara Guest
Rachel Hadas
Donald Hall
Robert Hass
Seamus Heaney
Anthony Hecht

Gerrit Henry
John Hollander
Richard Howard
Donald Justice
Robert Kelly
Kevin Killiam
August Kleinzahler
Carolina Knox
Kenneth Koch
John Koethe
Philip Lamantia
Ann Lauterbach
David Lehman
Philip Levine
Nathaniel Mackey

Michael Malinowitz
Tom Mandel
Harry Mathews
Bernadette Mayer
James Merrill
Eileen Myles
A. L. Nielson
Ron Padgett
Michael Palmer
Bob Perelman
Robert Pinsky
Donald Revell
Joe Ross
Leslie Scalapino
James Schuyler

David Shapiro
Charles Simic
Gary Snyder
Ruth Stone
May Swenson
James Tate
Lydia Tomkiw
Derek Walcott
Rosanne Wasserman
Majorie Welish
Susan Wheeler
Richard Wilbur
Alan Williamson
John Yau
Geoffrey Young

Other works published in English
 Frank Birbalsingh, Jahaji Bhai: An Anthology of Indo–Caribbean Literature
 Breyten Breytenbach, Judas Eye: 63 prison poems of an indefinite colour, South African
 Jayanta Mahapatra, Burden of Waves & Fruit, India

Works published in other languages
Listed by nation where the work was first published and again by the poet's native land, if different; substantially revised works listed separately:

Arabic language
 Nizar Qabbani, Syrian:
 Three Stone-throwing Children
 Secret Papers of a Karmathian Lover
 Biography of an Arab Executioner

French language
 Michel Deguy, Comité ("Committee"), a book attacking French publishers for using poets they rarely publish themselves to help determine which books of poetry to accept; France
 Abdellatif Laabi, translator, Je t'aime au gré de la mort, translated from the original Arabic of Samih al-Qâsim into French; Paris: Unesco/Éditions de Minuit
 Jean Royer, Poèmes d'amour, 1966-1986, Montréal: l'Hexagone; Canada

India
Listed in alphabetical order by first name:
 Debarati Mitra, Bhutera O Khuki, Kolkata: Ananda Publishers; Bengali-language
 K. Satchidanandan, Veedumattam, ("Changing House"); Malayalam-language
 K. Siva Reddy, Mohana! Oh Mohana!, Hyderabad: Jhari Poetry Circle, Telugu-language
 Kedarnath Singh, Akal Mein Saras, Delhi: Rajkamal Prakashan; Hindi
 Mallika Sengupta, Ami Sindhur Meye, Kolkata: Prativas Publication; Bengali-language
 Nitin Mehta, Nirvan, Ahmedabad: Chandramauli Prakashan; Gujarati-language
 Panna Nayak, ' 'Nisbat' '; Gujarati-language
 Rajendra Kishore Panda, Anya, Cuttack: Friends Publishers, Oraya-language
 Prathibha Nandakumar, Itanaka ("Until Now"), Bangalore: Kannada Sangha, Christ College; Kannada-language
 Tulasibahadur Chetri, nicknamed "Apatan", Karna-Kunti; Nepali-language

Poland
 Stanisław Barańczak, Widokowka z tego swiata ("A Postcard from the Other World"), Paris: Zeszyty Literackie
 Ryszard Krynicki,  ("Independent Nothingness (Selected and Revised Poems and Translations)"); Warsaw: NOWA
 Piotr Sommer, Czynnik liryczny i inne wiersze

Spanish Language Poetry

 Mario Benedetti, Yesterday y mañana ("Yesterday and Tomorrow"), Uruguay
 Giannina Braschi, El imperio de los sueños ("Empire of Dreams"), Puerto Rican writer published in Spain (Barcelona)
 Justo Jorge Padrón
 Antología poética, 1971-1988
 Los dones de la tierra
 Isabel Sabogal, „Requiebros vanos”, Lima

Other languages
 Gösta Ågren, Jär ("Here"), Swedish-language, Finland 
"Biblioteca de autores contemporaneos / Mario Benedetti - El autor" (in Spanish), retrieved May 27, 2009. Archived 2009-05-30.
 Dieter Breuer, editor, Deutsche Lyrik nach 1945, Frankfurt: Suhrkamp (scholarship) West Germany
 Christoph Buchwald, general editor, and Friederike Roth, guest editor, Luchterhand Jahrbuch der Lyrik 1988/89 ("Luchterhand Poetry Yearbook 1988/89"), publisher: Luchterhand; anthology; West Germany
 Niels Frank, Genfortryllelsen, Denmark
 Haim Gouri, Heshbon Over ("Current Account, Selected Poems"), Israeli writing in Hebrew
 Klaus Høeck, Lukas O'Kech, publisher: Brøndum; Denmark
 Nuala Ní Dhomhnaill, Selected Poems: Rogha Danta, Gaelic-language, Ireland
 Rami Saari, Hinne, Matzati Et Beyti ("Behold, I Found My Home"), Israeli writing in Hebrew

Awards and honors

Australia
 C. J. Dennis Prize for Poetry: Judith Beveridge, The Domesticity of Giraffes
 Kenneth Slessor Prize for Poetry: Judith Beveridge, The Domesticity of Giraffes
 Mary Gilmore Prize: Judith Beveridge, The Domesticity of Giraffes

Canada
 Gerald Lampert Award: Di Brandt, Questions I Asked My Mother
 Archibald Lampman Award: John Barton, West of Darkness
 1988 Governor General's Awards: Erín Moure, Furious (English); Marcel Labine, Papiers d'épidémie (French)
 Pat Lowther Award: Gwendolyn MacEwan, Afterworlds
 Prix Alain-Grandbois: Pierre Morency, Effets personnels
 Dorothy Livesay Poetry Prize: Patricia Young, All I Ever Needed Was a Beautiful Room
 Prix Émile-Nelligan: Renaud Longchamps, Légendes suivi de Sommation sur l’histoire

India
 Sahitya Akademi Award : Vikram Seth for The Golden Gate, a book of sonnets
 Poetry Society India National Poetry Competition : Vijay Nambisan for Madras Central

United Kingdom
 Cholmondeley Award : John Heath-Stubbs, Sean O'Brien, John Whitworth
 Eric Gregory Award : Michael Symmons Roberts, Gwyneth Lewis, Adrian Blackledge, Simon Armitage, Robert Crawford
 Queen's Gold Medal for Poetry : Derek Walcott
 National Poetry Competition : Martin Reed for The Widow's Dream

United States
 Agnes Lynch Starrett Poetry Prize: Maxine Scates, Toluca Street
 Aiken Taylor Award for Modern American Poetry: Richard Wilbur
 AML Award for poetry to Dennis Marden Clark for Tinder: answer might be. With an almost Augustinian Dry Poems
 Bernard F. Connors Prize for Poetry: David Lehman, "Mythologies"
 Frost Medal: Carolyn Kizer
 Poet Laureate Consultant in Poetry to the Library of Congress appointed: Howard Nemerov (also served 1963-64 in the same position, then named "Consultant in Poetry to the Library of Congress")
 Pulitzer Prize for Poetry: William Meredith: Partial Accounts: New and Selected Poems
 Ruth Lilly Poetry Prize: Anthony Hecht
 Whiting Awards: Michael Burkard, Li-Young Lee, Sylvia Moss
 Fellowship of the Academy of American Poets: Donald Justice

Births
19 June – Sarah Kay, American poet
1 August – Warsan Shire, African-born British poet
1 October – Michaela Coel, English poet, singer-songwriter, screenwriter, actress and playwright
14 October – Ocean Vuong, Vietnamese-born American poet
Jay Bernard, English writer and artist
Andrew McMillan, English poet and lecturer

Deaths
Birth years link to the corresponding "[year] in poetry" article:
 January 3 – Rose Ausländer, 86 (born 1901), Jewish poet writing in German
 February 3 – Robert Duncan, 69 (born 1919), American poet, heart attack
 March 19 – Máirtín Ó Direáin, 77 (born 1910), Irish poet writing in the Irish language
 March 26 – Henri Coulette, 60 (born 1927), American poet
 March 30 – John Clellon Holmes, 62 (born 1926), American poet and beat novelist, cancer
 May 3 – Premendra Mitra (born 1904) Bengali poet, novelist, short-story writer, including thrillers and science fiction
 June 16 – Miguel Piñero, 41 (born 1946), Puerto Rican-born American playwright, actor and co-founder of the Nuyorican Poets Café, cirrhosis of the liver
 June 27 – Léonie Adams, 88 (born 1899), American poet
 July 24 – Mira Schendel, 69 (born 1919), Swiss-born Brazilian modernist artist and poet
 September 18 – Mohammad-Hossein Shahriar, 81 (born 1906), Iranian Azari poet
 October 1 – Sir Sacheverell Sitwell, 90 (born 1897), English writer and arts critic
 November 2 – Stewart Parker, 47 (born 1941), Northern Irish poet and playwright
 November 8 – Hamad al-Hajji, 49 (born 1939), Saudi Arabian poet

See also

Poetry
List of years in poetry
List of poetry awards

References

20th-century poetry
Poetry